Cheerleaders Beach Party is a 1978 comedy film by producer/director Alex E. Goitein and writer Chuck Vincent.

It stars Elizabeth Loredan, Jamie Jenson, Lynn Hastings, and Gloria Upson as college cheerleaders out to save their team, the Rambling U. Rams.

It was released on DVD by Telavista in 2007.

Cast
 Elizabeth Loredan as Monica
 Jamie Jenson as Toni
 Lynn Hastings as Sissy
 Gloria Upson as Sheryl
 Rick Gitlin as Mitch Stevens
 Max Goff as Stanley Kraus

Rambling players and staff
 Mark Sarro as Bill Ubell
 John Williams as Lee Williams
 Michael Jefferson as Jim Norris
 Ray Sherry as Coach Hensen

State cheerleaders and staff
 Shoshanna Asher as Honey
 Cheri Southie as Ginger
 Malvina Golden as Sugar
 John Hart as Mr. Langley
 Robert E. Miller as Coach Wilson
 W.P. Dremak as Dean Higgins
 Joan Sumner as Mrs. Higgins

Plot
Rambling U. cheerleaders (Monica, Toni, Sissy, and Sheryl) work together to keep State U. from stealing Rambling’s star football players.

State’s Mr. Langley — on behalf of Coach Wilson — takes the players on a trip to Bell Harbor, to convince them that State has much more to offer. (better scholarships, facilities, contacts, and a more prestigious degree)

Rambling’s Coach Hensen does not see anything he can do to stop it, given Rambling’s limited resources, so the four girls take it on themselves to do whatever is required to convince the players to stay at Rambling. 1970s-era sex-comedy high jinks ensue as the girls compete with stuck-up State cheerleaders to get their players back.

The Rambling U. cheerleaders succeed by infiltrating parties and meetings with sex, disguises and drugs. Not only do they keep their players, but they recruit State's star players, Mitch Stevens and Stanley Kraus, to boot.

External links
 

1978 films
1978 comedy films
Cheerleading films
American comedy films
Golan-Globus films
Beach party films
Teensploitation
1970s American films